This is a list of seasons played by Valencia CF Femenino, the women's section of Spanish football club Valencia CF, and its predecessor DSV Colegio Alemán. The team was created in its original form in 1998, and has represented Valencia CF since the 2009–10 season.

Summary

References

Valencia CF Femenino
Valencia CF
Femenino seasons
Valencia CF Femenino seasons
Femenino Seasons